The Lucky One is a 2012 American romantic drama film directed by Scott Hicks and released in April 2012. It is an adaptation of Nicholas Sparks’ 2008 novel of the same name.

The film stars Zac Efron as Logan Thibault, a US Marine who finds a photograph of a young woman while serving in Iraq, carries it around as a good luck charm, and later tracks down the woman, with whom he begins a relationship.

The movie received negative reviews but grossed over $99.4 million.

Plot
Logan Thibault (Zac Efron), a US Marine serving in Iraq, witnesses a Marine called "Aces" die attempting to aid one of his men during an ambush. The following morning, he finds a picture of a young woman on the ground just before a mortar attack destroys where he had been sitting, killing many around him. Unsuccessful at finding the photo's owner, he keeps it. Logan's squad-mate declares the woman in the picture as his "guardian angel," just before an explosion destroys their Humvee.

Logan returns to Colorado to live with his sister's family, who have been looking after his dog, Zeus. Suffering from posttraumatic stress disorder (PTSD) and survivor guilt, he decides it is best to leave and departs to search for the woman in the photo. Logan and Zeus walk to Louisiana, where a lighthouse in the picture has provided a clue. He shows the photo around town and a local resident tells him that the woman used to be married to his friend, a local deputy sheriff.

Logan finds the woman, Beth Green (Taylor Schilling), but has difficulty explaining why he is there. She assumes he wants a job, and her grandmother, Ellie (Blythe Danner) hires him. At first, Beth is irritated by Logan's presence, but she begins to warm to him as his calm demeanor, willingness to work, and competence in repairing machinery are demonstrated. Logan develops a supportive relationship with Beth's son, Ben, who is without a positive male influence since the death of Beth's brother, Drake.

Beth's former husband, Sheriff's Deputy Keith Clayton (Jay R. Ferguson)—the son of the town's judge—is immediately suspicious of Logan. He is brusque and overbearing with the former Marine. He discourages Ben from playing the violin around him, leading to Ben practicing in his tree house. When Ben returns bloodied from a charity baseball game, Beth and Keith have an argument, and he threatens to use his connections to take full custody of Ben. She is anxious about Keith's short temper and is fearful of losing her son to him.

On the anniversary of Drake's death, Beth becomes distraught and Logan calms her down. Keith tries to stop the budding relationship between Beth and Logan, but Beth stands up to Keith, showing that she is not intimidated by him anymore. Keith learns that Logan was asking about her when he first arrived in town and steals the photo, telling Beth that Logan has been stalking her. Her trust destroyed, she is distraught and sends Logan away. Ellie tries to soften Beth, explaining to her that it isn't Logan's fault he survived and Drake did not.

An intoxicated Keith sees Logan walking with his dog and angrily confronts him, drawing his gun while people on the street begin to panic and run. Logan disarms him, turning the weapon over to another officer. He then heads home to pack, finding a photo of Beth's brother, Drake, inside a book Ben had given him. The tattoo on Drake's forearm says "Aces" and he realizes that Drake was the sergeant from the night raid. He returns to Beth's house to tell her what he knows of how Drake died.

At Judge Clayton's, Keith is shocked and embarrassed over what he did though his father tells him it will all blow over before the election. Keith walks out into a gathering storm, leaving his badge behind, and goes to Beth to plead for reconciliation. When she gently but firmly refuses, he threatens to take Ben away. Ben overhears and runs out into the storm, followed by Keith and Beth, just as Logan arrives. Ellie urges Logan to follow. Ben is en route to the treehouse, but the rope bridge gives way and he falls into the river along with his father, just as Beth and Logan arrive. Keith, caught in the rope of the bridge, calls to Logan who grabs Ben and hands him to Beth. Before Logan can return for Keith, the treehouse falls on him and he is swept away in the raging river to his death.

Back home, Beth thanks Logan for saving her son. Logan explains that Drake died saving one of his own men. He starts to leave, but Beth runs after him and says that he belongs with them. Later, Logan, Beth, Zeus, and Ben celebrate Ben's 9th birthday together.

Cast
 Zac Efron as Logan Thibault
 Taylor Schilling as Elizabeth "Beth" Green
 Blythe Danner as Ellie 
 Jay R. Ferguson as Keith Clayton
 Riley Thomas Stewart as Benjamin "Ben" Clayton
 Adam LeFevre as Judge Clayton
 Joe Chrest as Deputy Moore
 Ann McKenzie as Charlotte Clayton
 Kendal Tuttle as Drake "Aces" Green
 Robert Terrell Hayes as Victor
 Russ Comegys as Roger Lyle
 Sharon Morris as Principal Miller

Reception

Box office
The Lucky One has grossed $60,457,138 in North America and $38,900,000 in other territories for a worldwide total of $99,357,138.

In its opening weekend, the film grossed $22,518,358, finishing second at the box office behind Think Like a Man ($33,636,303).

Critical reception
The Lucky One received mostly negative reviews from critics. At Rotten Tomatoes, the film holds a "negative" rating of 20%, based on 148 reviews and an average rating of 4.3/10, with the critical consensus saying, "While it provides the requisite amount of escapist melodrama, The Lucky One ultimately relies on too many schmaltzy clichés to appeal to anyone not already familiar with the Nicholas Sparks formula". It also has a score of 39 on Metacritic based on 35 reviews, indicating "generally unfavorable reviews".

Awards

Home media
The Lucky One was released on DVD and Blu-ray on August 28, 2012, and grossed over 31 millions on sales.

References

External links

 
 
 
 
 The Lucky One at The Numbers

2012 films
2012 romantic drama films
2012 war drama films
American romantic drama films
American war drama films
Films based on works by Nicholas Sparks
Films based on romance novels
Films directed by Scott Hicks
Films set in Louisiana
Films shot in Louisiana
Iraq War films
Village Roadshow Pictures films
Films produced by Denise Di Novi
Films scored by Mark Isham
2010s English-language films
Films about post-traumatic stress disorder
2010s American films